Troy High School is a 3A public high school located in Troy in Texas, United States. It is part of the Troy Independent School District located in northern Bell County. In 2011, the school was rated "Academically Acceptable" by the Texas Education Agency.

Athletics
The Troy Trojans compete in the following sports:

Baseball
Basketball
Cross Country
Football
Golf
Powerlifting
Softball
Tennis
Track and Field
Volleyball

State Titles
Girls Basketball - 
1985(2A)
Softball - 
2000(2A), 2007(2A)

State Finalists
Softball –
2005(2A)

References

External links
Troy ISD

High schools in Bell County, Texas
Public high schools in Texas